Noorin TV, sometimes shortened as NTV, is a private non-governmental satellite television network that broadcasts from Kabul in Afghanistan. The service was launched in 2007.

Noorin broadcasts news, cartoons, films, dramas, music, and many other type of programmes. Their goal is to integrate western influence in Afghan television and create a modern bench mark for how television network stations are run in Afghanistan.

The channel is available in Afghanistan and Europe through the Turksat 3A satellite. They also have a radio station, called Noorin FM, available throughout Afghanistan on 94.4FM. The channel airs Hindi serials dubbed in Persian and Dari such as Kahiin To Hoga. It is the fifth most watched channel in Afghanishtan, Lemar TV being the fourth.

See also
List of Afghan TV Channels

References

Television stations in Afghanistan
Persian-language television stations
Television channels and stations established in 2007
Mass media in Kabul